"TSOP (The Sound of Philadelphia)" is a 1974 hit recording by MFSB featuring vocals by The Three Degrees. A classic example of the Philadelphia soul genre, it was written by Gamble and Huff as the theme for the American musical television program Soul Train, which specialized in African American musical performers.  The single was released on the Philadelphia International Records label. It was the first television theme song to reach number one on the Billboard Hot 100, and it is arguably the first disco song to reach that position.

Background
The song is essentially an instrumental piece, featuring a lush blend of string instruments and a horn section in the Philadelphia soul style.  There are only two vocal parts: a passage close to the beginning during which The Three Degrees sing "People all over the world!"; and the chorus over the fade out, "Let's get it on/It's time to get down". The words  "People all over the world!" are not heard in the original version. The version heard on Soul Train also had the series title sung over the first four notes of the melody, "Soul Train, Soul Train". This particular version was released on a 1975 Three Degrees album, International.

"TSOP" hit number one on the U.S. Billboard Hot 100 in the spring of 1974 and remained there for two weeks, the first television theme song to do so in the history of that chart. It also topped the American Best Selling Soul Singles (for one week) and adult contemporary (for two weeks). The Three Degrees would revisit the top of the AC chart later in 1974 with their hit single, "When Will I See You Again".

Don Cornelius, the creator and host of Soul Train, refused to allow any references to the name of the television series when the single was released, leading Gamble and Huff to adopt the alternate title for the release. Cornelius would later admit that not allowing the single to be named Soul Train was a major mistake on his part. (As a result, the Three Degrees' singing of the show's name "Soul Train" during the chorus as heard on the TV version is not heard on the single.)

Although it was rerecorded a number of times for future versions of the show, and various different themes were used during the late 1970s and early 1980s, "TSOP" returned in the late 1980s and remained the theme song for Soul Train through the disco, 1980s rhythm and blues, new jack swing, hip hop music, and neo soul eras of black music.

Covers and samples
"TSOP" was covered by Dexys Midnight Runners and released as a B-side on the 12" version of the "Jackie Wilson Said" single, later issued on the remastered version of the album Too-Rye-Ay.  The band also used it to open some of their live shows.

Another remake of the tune was made in 1978 by reggae band Inner Circle, who had a history of covering American soul songs in the laid-back reggae style of the late 1970s.

Two more renditions were made in 1987 (by George Duke), and 1999 (by Sampson); both versions would be used as themes for Soul Train. The 1999 theme would be used until Soul Trains final episode in 2006.

In 1998, German act BMR featuring Dutch singer Felicia Uwaje sampled the single in their song Check It Out.

A similar melody is used in the anime series Haré+Guu.

Uses of the song
The song is played at Citizens Bank Park in Philadelphia prior to every Philadelphia Phillies home game. It was also played after Vancouver Whitecaps (1974–1984) NASL home games at Empire Stadium in the late 1970s and early 1980s, and after Vancouver Whitecaps (1986–2010) CSL home games in the late 1980s and early 1990s. Game Ka Na Ba?, a Philippines game show hosted by actor/politician Edu Manzano, used an adaptation of "TSOP" (Tanya) called "Papayo Yowza" as its theme. The opening was also sampled as program identification for all Philadelphia 76ers games broadcast on WPHT in the mid-to-late 1970s and also used as a during timeout and before cut into a commercial break for the CBS Sports NBA on CBS games in the beginning of the 1975 NBA playoffs until the 1976 NBA Finals.

Chart history

Weekly charts

Year-end charts

See also

References

External links
 

1973 songs
1973 singles
MFSB songs
Philadelphia International Records singles
Music television series theme songs
Billboard Hot 100 number-one singles
Cashbox number-one singles
RPM Top Singles number-one singles
1970s instrumentals
Songs written by Leon Huff
Soul Train
Philadelphia Phillies
Philadelphia 76ers
Songs written by Kenny Gamble